Pre-mRNA-splicing factor ATP-dependent RNA helicase PRP16 is an enzyme that in humans is encoded by the DHX38 gene.

DEAD box proteins, characterized by the conserved motif Asp-Glu-Ala-Asp (DEAD), are putative RNA helicases. They are implicated in a number of cellular processes involving alteration of RNA secondary structure such as translation initiation, nuclear and mitochondrial splicing, and ribosome and spliceosome assembly. Based on their distribution patterns, some members of this family are believed to be involved in embryogenesis, spermatogenesis, and cellular growth and division. The protein encoded by this gene is a member of the DEAD/H box family of splicing factors. This protein resembles yeast Prp16 more closely than other DEAD/H family members. It is an ATPase and essential for the catalytic step II in pre-mRNA splicing process.

References

Further reading